This article is a list of historic places in the Edmonton Metropolitan Region entered on the Canadian Register of Historic Places, whether they are federal, provincial, or municipal.

List

See also 

 List of historic places in Alberta
 List of historic places in the Calgary Region
 List of National Historic Sites of Canada in Alberta

Edmonton Region
Edmonton-related lists
Edmonton